Swiftian may refer to:

 Anglo-Irish satirist and essayist Jonathan Swift or his works.
 American singer-songwriter Taylor Swift or her works.